The Panchadara Kalasa is a variety of mango native to Andhra Pradesh, India, specifically in the East Godavari district. It is also grown in Telangana, the coastal areas of Andhra Pradesh and Rayalaseema. The name Panchadara Kalasa translates to "sugar pot" in English, referencing its taste and pot-like shape.

Similar to the Chinna Rasalu variety of mango, the Panchadara Kalasa has a thick skin and sweet, juicy flesh, and is commonly eaten by sucking the juice or squeezing the mango. The fibers of the fruit are short and soft. It is susceptible to powdery mildew and moderately tolerant to grasshoppers.

References 

Mango cultivars of India